The 53rd Annual Grammy Awards were held on February 13, 2011, at the Staples Center in Los Angeles. They were broadcast on CBS with a rating of 26.6 million viewers. Barbra Streisand was honored as the MusiCares Person of the Year two nights prior to the telecast on February 11. Nominations were announced on December 1, 2010 and a total of 109 awards were presented. Most of the awards were presented during the pre-telecast, which took place at the Los Angeles Convention Center next to the Staples Center, where the main telecast took place. The eligibility period was October 1, 2009 to September 30, 2010.

For the third year, nominations were announced on prime-time television as part of "The GRAMMY Nominations Concert Live! – Countdown to Music's Biggest Night" a one-hour special broadcast live on CBS from Club Nokia at L.A. Live.

Arcade Fire won Album of the Year for The Suburbs becoming the first indie act to do so, and surprising many viewers and critics. Baba Yetu composed and arranged by Christopher Tin won Best Instrumental Arrangement Accompanying Vocalist(s), the first Grammy given to a piece of music written for a video game. Esperanza Spalding was awarded Best New Artist. Lady Antebellum won five awards including Record of the Year and Song of the Year for "Need You Now". Other multiple winners include: David Frost, John Legend, Lady Gaga, Jay-Z, and Jeff Beck with three awards each. The Black Keys, Eminem, Herbie Hancock, Alicia Keys, The Roots, Usher, Christopher Tin and BeBe Winans won two awards each.

The television broadcast of the 53rd Grammy Awards marked the last awards show for the Grammy's executive producer, John Cossette, before his death on April 26, 2011.

Performers

Pre-telecast ceremony

ChocQuibTown
Trombone Shorty
Buddy Guy, Cyndi Lauper, Maria Muldaur, Kenny Wayne Shepherd, Mavis Staples, and Betty Wright
Kirk Whalum

Telecast ceremony
The following performed:

Presenters
Pre-telecast ceremony
BT
Kathy Griffin
Wayne Wallace
Laurie Anderson
Sara Bareilles

Telecast ceremony
The following presented:

LL Cool J — presented the Aretha Franklin-tribute
Ricky Martin — introduced Lady Gaga
Blake Shelton — introduced Miranda Lambert
Lenny Kravitz — introduced Muse
Ryan Seacrest — introduced Bruno Mars, B.o.B, and Janelle Monáe
Dierks Bentley and Zac Brown — presented Best Female Country Vocal Performance
Eva Longoria — introduced Justin Bieber, Jaden Smith and Usher
Paramore and Pauley Perrette — presented Best Rock Album
Selena Gomez and Donnie Wahlberg — presented Best Pop Vocal Album
David Letterman — introduced Bob Dylan, Mumford & Sons, and The Avett Bros.
Clay Matthews and Lea Michele — introduced Lady Antebellum
Kings of Leon and Miley Cyrus — presented Best Country Album
Jamie Foxx — introduced Cee Lo Green, Gwyneth Paltrow and The Jim Henson Company Puppets
Neil Patrick Harris — introduced Katy Perry
John Mayer, Norah Jones and Keith Urban — presented Song of the Year
Seth Rogen — introduced Eminem, Dr. Dre, and Rihanna
Jewel and John Legend — presented Best New Artist
Matthew Morrison — introduced Recording Academy President Neil Portnow
Kris Kristofferson — introduced Barbra Streisand
Nicki Minaj and will.i.am — presented Best Rap Album
Diddy — introduced Drake and Rihanna
Marc Anthony and Jennifer Lopez — presented Record of the Year
Barbra Streisand and Kris Kristofferson — presented Album of the Year
Jason Segel — introduced Arcade Fire

Awards

General 
Record of the Year
"Need You Now" – Lady Antebellum
 Lady Antebellum & Paul Worley, producers; Clarke Schleicher, engineer/mixer
"Nothin' on You" – B.o.B & Bruno Mars
The Smeezingtons, producers; Ari Levine, engineer/mixer
"Love the Way You Lie" – Eminem featuring Rihanna
Alex da Kid & Makeba Riddick, producers; Alex da Kid, Eminem & Mike Strange, engineers/mixers
"F*** You" – Cee-Lo Green
The Smeezingtons, producers; Manny Marroquin & Graham Marsh, engineers/mixers
"Empire State of Mind" – Jay-Z & Alicia Keys
Angela Hunte, Jane't "Jnay" Sewell-Ulepic & Shux, producers; Ken "Duro" Ifill, Gimel "Young Guru" Keaton & Ann Mincieli, engineers/mixers

Album of the Year
The Suburbs – Arcade FireArcade Fire & Markus Dravs, producers; Arcade Fire, Mark Lawson & Craig Silvey, engineers/mixers; Mark Lawson, mastering engineerRecovery – Eminem
 Kobe, Lil Wayne, Pink & Rihanna, featured artists; Alex da Kid, Victor Alexander, Boi-1da, Nick Brongers, Dwayne "Supa Dups" Chin-Quee, DJ Khalil, Dr. Dre, Eminem, Jason Gilbert, Havoc, Emile Haynie, Jim Jonsin, Just Blaze, Magnedo7, Mr. Porter, Robert Reyes, Makeba Riddick & Script Shepherd, producers; Alex Da Kid, Dwayne "Supa Dups" Chin-Quee, Kal "Boogie" Dellaportas, Dr. Dre, Eminem, Mauricio "Veto" Iragorri, Just Blaze, Robert Marks, Alex Merzin, Matthew Samuels, Joe Strange, Mike Strange & Ryan West, engineers/mixers; Brian "Big Bass" Gardner, mastering engineer
Need You Now – Lady Antebellum
Lady Antebellum & Paul Worley, producers; Clarke Schleicher, engineer/mixer; Andrew Mendelson, mastering engineer
The Fame Monster – Lady Gaga
Beyoncé, featured artist; Ron Fair, Fernando Garibay, Tal Herzberg, Rodney Jerkins, Lady Gaga, RedOne, Teddy Riley & Space Cowboy, producers; Victor Alexander, Eelco Bakker, Christian Delano, Mike Donaldson, Paul Foley, Tal Herzberg, Rodney Jenkins, Hisashi Mizoguchi, Robert Orton, Dan Parry, Jack Joseph Puig, RedOne, Teddy Riley, Dave Russel, Johnny Severin, Space Cowboy, Mark Stent, Jonas Wetling & Frank Wolff, engineers/mixers; Gene Grimaldi, mastering engineer
Teenage Dream – Katy Perry
Snoop Dogg, featured artist; Ammo, Benny Blanco, Dr. Luke, Kuk Harrell, Max Martin, Stargate, C. "Tricky" Stewart, Sandy Vee & Greg Wells, producers; Victor Alexander, Steve Churchyard, Mikkel S. Eriksen, Serban Ghenea, John Hanes, Sam Holland, Jaycen-Joshua, Damien Lewis, Chris O'Ryan, Carlos Oyanedel, Paris, Phil Tan, Brain Thomas, Lewis Tozour, Miles Walker, Emily Wright & Andrew Wuepper, engineers/mixers; Brian Gardner, mastering engineer

Song of the Year"Need You Now"Dave Haywood, Josh Kear, Charles Kelley & Hillary Scott, songwriters (Lady Antebellum)"Beg, Steal or Borrow"
Ray LaMontagne, songwriter (Ray LaMontagne and the Pariah Dogs)
"F*** You"
Cee Lo Green, Philip Lawrence & Bruno Mars, songwriters (Cee Lo Green)
"The House That Built Me"
Tom Douglas & Allen Shamblin songwriters (Miranda Lambert)
"Love the Way You Lie"
Alexander Grant, Holly Hafferman & Marshall Mathers, songwriters (Eminem featuring Rihanna)

Best New ArtistEsperanza SpaldingJustin Bieber
Drake
Florence & The Machine
Mumford & Sons

 Pop 
Best Female Pop Vocal Performance"Bad Romance" – Lady Gaga"King of Anything" – Sara Bareilles
"Halo" (Live from I Am... Yours: An Intimate Performance at Wynn Las Vegas) – Beyoncé
"Chasing Pirates" – Norah Jones
"Teenage Dream" – Katy Perry

Best Male Pop Vocal Performance"Just the Way You Are" – Bruno Mars"Haven't Met You Yet" – Michael Bublé
"This Is It" – Michael Jackson
"Whataya Want from Me" – Adam Lambert
"Half of My Heart" – John Mayer

Best Pop Performance by a Duo or Group with Vocal"Hey, Soul Sister" (Live) – Train"Don't Stop Believin'" (Regionals Version) – Glee Cast
"Misery" – Maroon 5
"The Only Exception" – Paramore
"Babyfather" – Sade

Best Pop Collaboration with Vocals"Imagine" – Herbie Hancock, Pink, India.Arie, Seal, Konono Nº1, Jeff Beck, & Oumou Sangaré"Airplanes, Part II" – B.o.B, Eminem, & Hayley Williams
"If It Wasn't for Bad" – Elton John & Leon Russell
"Telephone" – Lady Gaga & Beyoncé
"California Gurls" – Katy Perry & Snoop Dogg

Best Pop Instrumental Performance"Nessun Dorma" – Jeff Beck"Flow" – Laurie Anderson
"No Mystery" – Stanley Clarke
"Orchestral Intro" – Gorillaz
"Sleepwalk" – The Brian Setzer Orchestra

Best Pop Instrumental AlbumTake Your Pick – Larry Carlton & Tak MatsumotoPushing the Envelope – Gerald Albright
Heart and Soul – Kenny G
Singularity – Robby Krieger
Everything Is Everything: The Music of Donny Hathaway – Kirk Whalum

Best Pop Vocal AlbumThe Fame Monster – Lady GagaMy World 2.0 – Justin Bieber
I Dreamed a Dream – Susan Boyle
Battle Studies – John Mayer
Teenage Dream – Katy Perry

Notes

Dance
Best Dance Recording"Only Girl (In the World)" – RihannaCrystal Johnson, Mikkel S. Eriksen, Tor Erik Hermansen, Sandy Wilhelm, producers: Stargate, Sandy Vee"Rocket" – Goldfrapp
Alison Goldfrapp & Will Gregory, producers; Mark 'Spike' Stent, mixer
"In for the Kill" – La Roux
Elly Jackson & Ben Langmaid, producers; Serban Ghenea & John Hanes, mixers
"Dance in the Dark" – Lady Gaga
Fernando Garibay & Lady Gaga, producers; Robert Orton, mixer
"Dancing on My Own" – Robyn
Patrik Berger & Robyn, producers; Niklas Flyckt, mixer

Best Electronic/Dance AlbumLa Roux – La RouxThese Hopeful Machines – BT
Further – The Chemical Brothers
Head First – Goldfrapp
Black Light – Groove Armada

 Traditional pop 
Best Traditional Pop Vocal AlbumCrazy Love – Michael Bublé The Greatest Love Songs of All Time – Barry Manilow
 Let It Be Me: Mathis in Nashville – Johnny Mathis
 Fly Me to the Moon... The Great American Songbook Volume V – Rod Stewart
 Love Is the Answer – Barbra Streisand

 Rock 
Best Solo Rock Vocal Performance"Helter Skelter" – Paul McCartney "Run Back to Your Side" – Eric Clapton
 "Crossroads" – John Mayer
 "Silver Rider" – Robert Plant and the Band of Joy
 "Angry World" – Neil Young

Best Rock Performance by a Duo or Group with Vocal"Tighten Up" – The Black Keys "Ready to Start" – Arcade Fire
 "I Put a Spell on You" – Jeff Beck & Joss Stone
 "Radioactive" – Kings of Leon
 "Resistance" – Muse

Best Hard Rock Performance"New Fang" – Them Crooked Vultures "A Looking in View" – Alice in Chains
 "Let Me Hear You Scream" – Ozzy Osbourne
 "Black Rain" – Soundgarden
 "Between the Lines" – Stone Temple Pilots

Best Metal Performance"El Dorado" – Iron Maiden "Let the Guilt Go" – Korn
 "In Your Words" – Lamb of God
 "Sudden Death" – Megadeth
 "World Painted Blood" – Slayer

Best Rock Instrumental Performance"Hammerhead" – Jeff Beck "Black Mud" – The Black Keys
 "Do the Murray" – Los Lobos
 "Kundalini Bonfire" – Dave Matthews & Tim Reynolds
 "The Deathless Horsie" – Dweezil Zappa

Best Rock Song"Angry World"Neil Young, songwriter (Neil Young) "Little Lion Man"
 Ted Dwane, Ben Lovett, Marcus Mumford & Country Winston, songwriters (Mumford & Sons)
 "Radioactive"
 Caleb Followill, Jared Followill, Matthew Followill & Nathan Followill, songwriters (Kings of Leon)
 "Resistance"
 Matthew Bellamy, songwriter (Muse)
 "Tighten Up"
 Dan Auerbach & Patrick Carney, songwriters (The Black Keys)

Best Rock AlbumThe Resistance – Muse Emotion & Commotion – Jeff Beck
 Backspacer – Pearl Jam
 Mojo – Tom Petty and the Heartbreakers
 Le Noise – Neil Young

 Alternative 
Best Alternative Music AlbumBrothers – The Black KeysThe Suburbs – Arcade Fire
 Infinite Arms – Band of Horses
 Broken Bells – Broken Bells
 Contra – Vampire Weekend

 R&B 
Best Female R&B Vocal Performance"Bittersweet" – Fantasia "Everything to Me" – Monica
 "Gone Already" – Faith Evans
 "Tired" – Kelly Price
 "Holding You Down" – Jazmine Sullivan

Best Male R&B Vocal Performance"There Goes My Baby" – Usher "Second Chance" – El DeBarge
 "Finding My Way Back" – Jaheim
 "Why Would You Stay" – Kem
 "We're Still Friends" – Kirk Whalum & Musiq Soulchild

Best R&B Performance by a Duo or Group with Vocals"Soldier of Love" – Sade"Love" – Chuck Brown, Jill Scott & Marcus Miller
"Take My Time" – Chris Brown & Tank
"You've Got a Friend" – Ronald Isley & Aretha Franklin
"Shine" – John Legend & The Roots

Best Traditional R&B Vocal Performance"Hang On in There" – John Legend & The Roots"When a Woman Loves" – R. Kelly
"You're So Amazing" – Calvin Richardson
"In Between" – Ryan Shaw
"Go" (Live) – Betty Wright

Best Urban/Alternative Performance"Fuck You" – Cee Lo Green"Little One" – Bilal
"Orion" – Carolyn Malachi
"Tightrope" – Janelle Monáe & Big Boi
"Still" – Eric Roberson

Best R&B Song"Shine"John Stephens, songwriter (John Legend & The Roots) "Bittersweet"
Charles Harmon & Claude Kelly, songwriters (Fantasia)
"Finding My Way Back"
Ivan "Orthodox" Barias, Curt Chambers, Carvin "Ransum" Haggins, Jaheim Hoagland & Miquel Jontel, songwriters (Jaheim)
"Second Chance"
El DeBarge & Mischke, songwriters (El DeBarge)
"Why Would You Stay"
Kim Owens, songwriter (Kem)

Best R&B AlbumWake Up! – John Legend & The RootsStill Standing – Monica
Back to Me – Fantasia
Another Round – Jaheim
The Love & War Masterpeace – Raheem DeVaughn

Best Contemporary R&B AlbumRaymond vs. Raymond – UsherUntitled – R. Kelly
Graffiti – Chris Brown
Transition – Ryan Leslie
The ArchAndroid – Janelle Monáe

 Rap 
Best Rap Solo Performance"Not Afraid" – Eminem"Over" – Drake
"How Low" – Ludacris
"I'm Back" – T.I.
"Power" – Kanye West

Best Rap Performance by a Duo or Group"On to the Next One" – Jay Z & Swizz Beatz"Shutterbugg" – Big Boi & Cutty
"Fancy" – Drake, T.I. & Swizz Beatz
"My Chick Bad" – Ludacris & Nicki Minaj
"Lose My Mind" – Young Jeezy & Plies

Best Rap/Sung Collaboration"Empire State of Mind" – Jay-Z & Alicia Keys"Nothin' on You" – B.o.B & Bruno Mars
"Deuces" – Chris Brown, Tyga & Kevin McCall
"Love the Way You Lie" – Eminem & Rihanna
"Wake Up Everybody" – John Legend, The Roots, Melanie Fiona & Common

Best Rap Song"Empire State of Mind"Shawn Carter, Angela Hunte, Burt Keyes, Alicia Keys, Jane't "Jnay" Sewell-Ulepic & Alexander Shuckburgh, songwriters (Jay-Z & Alicia Keys)"Love the Way You Lie"
Alex da Kid, Holly Hafferman & Marshall Mathers, songwriters (Eminem & Rihanna)
"Not Afraid"
Matthew Burnett, Jordan Evans, Marshall Mathers, Luis Resto & Matthew Samuels, songwriters (Eminem)
"Nothin' on You"
Philip Lawrence, Ari Levine, Bruno Mars & Bobby Simmons Jr., songwriters (B.o.B. & Bruno Mars)
"On to the Next One"
Shawn Carter, Kasseem Dean, Gaspard Augé, Xavier de Rosnay & Jessie Chaton, songwriters (Jay-Z & Swizz Beatz)

Best Rap AlbumRecovery – EminemThe Adventures Of Bobby Ray – B.o.B.
Thank Me Later – Drake
The Blueprint 3 – Jay-Z
How I Got Over – The Roots

 Country 
Best Female Country Vocal Performance"The House That Built Me" – Miranda Lambert 
"Satisfied" – Jewel
"Swingin'" – LeAnn Rimes
"Temporary Home" – Carrie Underwood
"I'd Love To Be Your Last" – Gretchen Wilson

Best Male Country Vocal Performance"'Til Summer Comes Around" – Keith Urban"Macon" – Jamey Johnson
"Cryin' for Me (Wayman's Song)" – Toby Keith
"Turning Home" – David Nail
"Gettin' You Home" – Chris Young

Best Country Performance by a Duo or Group with Vocals"Need You Now" – Lady Antebellum"Free" – Zac Brown Band
"Elizabeth" – Dailey & Vincent
"Little White Church" – Little Big Town
"Where Rainbows Never Die" – The SteelDrivers

Best Country Collaboration with Vocals"As She's Walking Away" – Zac Brown Band & Alan Jackson"Bad Angel" – Dierks Bentley, Miranda Lambert & Jamey Johnson
"Pride (In the Name of Love)" – Dierks Bentley, Del McCoury & The Punch Brothers
"Hillbilly Bone" – Blake Shelton & Trace Adkins
"I Run to You" – Marty Stuart & Connie Smith

Best Country Instrumental Performance"Hummingbyrd" – Marty Stuart"Tattoo of a Smudge" – Cherryholmes
"Magic #9" – The Infamous Stringdusters
"New Chance Blues" – Punch Brothers
"Willow Creek" – Darrell Scott

Best Country Song"Need You Now"Dave Haywood, Josh Kear, Charles Kelley & Hillary Scott, songwriters (Lady Antebellum)"The Breath You Take"
Casey Beathard, Dean Dillon & Jessie Jo Dillon, songwriters (George Strait)
"Free"
Zac Brown, songwriter (Zac Brown Band)
"The House That Built Me"
Tom Douglas & Allen Shamblin, songwriters (Miranda Lambert)
"I'd Love to Be Your Last"
Rivers Rutherford, Annie Tate & Sam Tate, songwriters (Gretchen Wilson)
"If I Die Young"
Kimberly Perry, songwriter (The Band Perry)

Best Country AlbumNeed You Now – Lady AntebellumUp On The Ridge – Dierks Bentley
You Get What You Give – Zac Brown Band
The Guitar Song – Jamey Johnson
Revolution – Miranda Lambert

 New Age 
Best New Age AlbumMiho: Journey to the Mountain – Paul Winter ConsortOcean – Michael DeMaria
Sacred Journey of Ku-Kai, Volume 4 – Kitaro
Dancing into Silence – R. Carlos Nakai, William Eaton & Will Clipman
Instrumental Oasis, Vol. 4 – Zamora

 Jazz 
Best Contemporary Jazz AlbumThe Stanley Clarke Band – The Stanley Clarke BandNever Can Say Goodbye – Joey DeFrancesco
Now Is the Time – Jeff Lorber Fusion
To the One – John McLaughlin
Backatown – Trombone Shorty

Best Jazz Vocal AlbumEleanora Fagan (1915-1959): To Billie with Love from Dee Dee Bridgewater – Dee Dee BridgewaterFreddy Cole Sings Mr. B – Freddy Cole
When Lights Are Low – Denise Donatelli
Ages – Lorraine Feather
Water – Gregory Porter

Best Improvised Jazz Solo"A Change Is Gonna Come" – Herbie Hancock"Solar" – Alan Broadbent
"Body and Soul" – Keith Jarrett
"Lonely Woman" – Hank Jones
"Van Gogh" – Wynton Marsalis

Best Jazz Instrumental Album, Individual or GroupMoody 4B – James MoodyPositootly! – John Beasley
The New Song and Dance – Clayton Brothers
Historicity – Vijay Iyer Trio
Providencia – Danilo Pérez

Best Large Jazz Ensemble AlbumMingus Big Band Live at Jazz Standard – Mingus Big BandInfernal Machines – Darcy James Argue's Secret Society
Autumn: In Moving Pictures Jazz – Chamber Music Vol. 2 – Billy Childs Ensemble featuring the Ying String Quartet
Pathways – Dave Holland Octet
54 – Metropole Orkest, John Scofield & Vince Mendoza

Best Latin Jazz AlbumChucho's Steps – Chucho Valdés and the Afro-Cuban MessengersTango Grill – Pablo Aslan
Second Chance – Hector Martignon
Psychedelic Blues – Poncho Sanchez
¡Bien Bien! – Wayne Wallace Latin Jazz Quintet

 Gospel 
Best Gospel Performance"Grace" – BeBe & CeCe Winans"He Wants It All" – Forever Jones
"You Hold My World" – Israel Houghton
"Nobody Greater" – VaShawn Mitchell
"He's Been Just That Good – Kirk Whalum & Lalah Hathaway

Best Gospel Song"It's What I Do"Jerry Peters & Kirk Whalum, songwriters (Kirk Whalum & Lalah Hathaway)"Beautiful Things"
Lisa Gungor & Michael Gungor, songwriters (Gungor)
"Better Than a Hallelujah"
Sarah Hart & Chapin Hartford, songwriters (Amy Grant)
"Our God"
Jonas Myrin, Matt Redman, Jesse Reeves & Chris Tomlin, songwriters (Chris Tomlin)
"Return to Sender"
Gordon Kennedy, songwriter (Ricky Skaggs)

Best Rock or Rap Gospel AlbumHello Hurricane – SwitchfootChurch Music – David Crowder Band
For Those Who Wait – Fireflight
Beautiful Things – Gungor
Rehab – Lecrae

Best Pop/Contemporary Gospel AlbumLove God. Love People. – Israel HoughtonBeauty Will Rise – Steven Curtis Chapman
Pieces of a Real Heart – Sanctus Real
Mosaic – Ricky Skaggs
Tonight – TobyMac

Best Southern, Country, or Bluegrass Gospel AlbumThe Reason – Diamond RioTimes Like These – Austins Bridge
Expecting Good Things – Jeff & Sheri Easter
Journey On – Ty Herndon
Live at Oak Tree: Karen Peck & New River – Karen Peck & New River

Best Traditional Gospel AlbumDowntown Church – Patty GriffinThe Experience – Vanessa Bell Armstrong
A City Called Heaven – Shirley Caesar
Here I Am – Marvin Sapp
All in One – Karen Clark Sheard

Best Contemporary R&B Gospel AlbumStill – BeBe & CeCe WinansGet Ready – Forever Jones
Love Unstoppable – Fred Hammond
Triumphant – VaShawn Mitchell
Aaron Sledge – Aaron Sledge

 Latin 
Best Latin Pop AlbumParaíso Express – Alejandro SanzPoquita Ropa – Ricardo Arjona
Alex Cuba – Alex Cuba
Boleto de Entrada – Kany García
Otra Cosa – Julieta Venegas

Best Latin Rock, Alternative or Urban AlbumEl Existential – Grupo FantasmaOro – ChocQuibTown
Amor Vincit Omnia – Draco
Bulevar 2000 – Nortec Collective Presents: Bostich+Fussible
1977 – Ana Tijoux

Best Tropical Latin AlbumViva la Tradición – Spanish Harlem OrchestraSin Salsa No Hay Paraiso – El Gran Combo de Puerto Rico
Asondeguerra – Juan Luis Guerra 4.40
Irrepetible – Gilberto Santa Rosa
100 Sones Cubanos – (Various Artists); Edesio Alejandro, Nelson Estevez & Juan Hidalgo, producers

Best Tejano AlbumRecuerdos – Little Joe & la FamiliaSabes Bien – Juan P. Moreno
In the Pocket – Joe Posada
Homenaje a Mi Padre – Sunny Sauceda y Todo Eso
Cookin – Tortilla Factory

Best Norteño AlbumClassic – IntocableIndispensable – Angel Fresnillo
Ni Hoy Ni Mañana – Gerardo Ortíz
Desde la Cantina Volumen 1 – Pesado
Intensamente – Principez de la Musica Norteña

Best Banda AlbumEnamórate de Mí – El Guero Y Su Banda CentenarioAndo Bien Pedo – Banda Los Recoditos
Caricias Compradas... – Cuisillos
Con la Fuerza del Corrido – El Chapo
Todo Depende de Ti – La Arrolladora Banda El Limón

 American roots music 
Best Americana AlbumYou Are Not Alone – Mavis StaplesThe List – Rosanne Cash
Tin Can Trust – Los Lobos
Country Music – Willie Nelson
Band of Joy – Robert Plant

Best Bluegrass AlbumMountain Soul II – Patty LovelessCircles Around Me – Sam Bush
Family Circle – The Del McCoury Band
Legacy – Peter Rowan Bluegrass Band
Reckless – The SteelDrivers

Best Traditional Blues AlbumJoined at the Hip – Pinetop Perkins & Willie 'Big Eyes' SmithGiant – James Cotton
Memphis Blues – Cyndi Lauper
The Well – Charlie Musselwhite
Plays Blues, Ballads & Favorites – Jimmie Vaughan

Best Contemporary Blues AlbumLiving Proof – Buddy GuyNothing's Impossible – Solomon Burke
Tribal – Dr. John and the Lower 911
Interpretations: The British Rock Songbook – Bettye LaVette
Live! In Chicago – Kenny Wayne Shepherd Band featuring Hubert Sumlin, Willie "Big Eyes" Smith, Bryan Lee, and Buddy Flett

Best Traditional Folk AlbumGenuine Negro Jig – Carolina Chocolate DropsOnward and Upward – Luther Dickinson & The Sons Of Mudboy
Memories of John – The John Hartford Stringband
Maria Muldaur & Her Garden Of Joy – Maria Muldaur
Ricky Skaggs Solo: Songs My Dad Loved – Ricky Skaggs

Best Contemporary Folk AlbumGod Willin' & the Creek Don't Rise – Ray LaMontagne and the Pariah DogsLove Is Strange: En Vivo Con Tino – Jackson Browne & David Lindley
The Age of Miracles – Mary Chapin Carpenter
Somedays the Song Writes You – Guy Clark
Dream Attic – Richard Thompson

Best Hawaiian Music AlbumHuana Ke Aloha – Tia CarrereAmy Hanaiali'i and Slack Key Masters of Hawaii – Amy Hanaiali‘i And Slack Key Masters of Hawaii
Polani – Daniel Ho
The Legend – Ledward Kaapana
Maui on My Mind – Hawaiian Slack Key Guitar – Jeff Peterson

Best Native American Music Album2010 Gathering of Nations Pow Wow: A Spirit's Dance – (Various Artists); Derek Mathews, Dr. Lita Mathews & Melonie Mathews, producersXI – Bear Creek
Temptations: Cree Round Dance Songs – Northern Cree
Woodnotes Wyld: Historic Flute Sounds from the Dr. Richard W. Payne Collection – Peter Phippen

Best Zydeco or Cajun Music AlbumZydeco Junkie – Chubby Carrier and the Bayou Swamp BandEn Couleurs – Feufollet
Happy Go Lucky – D. L. Menard
Back Home – The Pine Leaf Boys
Creole Moon: Live at the Blue Moon Saloon – Cedric Watson et Bijou Créole

Reggae
Best Reggae AlbumBefore the Dawn – Buju BantonIsaacs Meets Isaac – Gregory Isaacs & King Isaac
Revelation – Lee "Scratch" Perry
Made in Jamaica – Bob Sinclar And Sly & Robbie
One Pop Reggae + – Sly & Robbie and the Family Taxi
Legacy An Acoustic Tribute to Peter Tosh – Andrew Tosh

 World music 

Best Traditional World Music AlbumAli and Toumani – Ali Farka Touré & Toumani DiabatéPure Sounds – Gyuto Monks of Tibet
I Speak Fula – Bassekou Kouyate & Ngoni Ba
Mushtari- a live concert - Cassius Khan
Grace – Soweto Gospel Choir
Tango Universal – Vayo

Best Contemporary World Music AlbumThrow Down Your Heart, Africa Sessions Part 2: Unreleased Tracks – Béla FleckAll in One – Bebel Gilberto
ÕŸÖ – Angelique Kidjo
Bom Tempo – Sérgio Mendes
Om Namo Narayanaya: Soul Call – Chandrika Krishnamurthy Tandon

 Children's 
Best Musical Album for ChildrenTomorrow's Children – Pete Seeger with the Rivertown Kids and FriendsHere Comes Science – They Might Be Giants
Jungle Gym – Justin Roberts
Sunny Days – Battersby Duo
Weird Things Are Everywhere! – Judy Pancoast

Best Spoken Word Album for ChildrenJulie Andrews' Collection of Poems, Songs, And Lullabies – Julie Andrews & Emma Walton HamiltonAnne Frank: The Diary of a Young Girl: The Definitive Edition – Selma Blair
The Best Candy in the Whole World – Bill Harley
Healthy Food For Thought: Good Enough to Eat – (Various Artists); Jim Cravero, Paula Lizzi & Steve Pullara, producers
Nanny McPhee Returns – Emma Thompson

 Spoken Word 
Best Spoken Word AlbumEarth – Jon Stewart (With Samantha Bee, Wyatt Cenac, Jason Jones, John Oliver & Sigourney Weaver)American on Purpose – Craig Ferguson
The Bedwetter – Sarah Silverman
A Funny Thing Happened on the Way to the Future… – Michael J. Fox
This Time Together: Laughter and Reflection – Carol Burnett
The Woody Allen Collection: Mere Anarchy, Side Effects, Without Feathers, Getting Even – Woody Allen

 Comedy 
Best Comedy AlbumStark Raving Black – Lewis BlackCho Dependent – Margaret Cho
I Told You I Was Freaky – Flight of the Conchords
Kathy Griffin Does the Bible Belt – Kathy Griffin
Weapons of Self Destruction – Robin Williams

 Musical show 
Best Musical Show AlbumAmerican Idiot (featuring Green Day) – Billie Joe Armstrong, producer (Green Day, composers; Billie Joe Armstrong, lyricist) Fela! – Robert Sher, producer (Fela Anikulapo-Kuti, composer; Fela Anikulapo-Kuti, lyricist)
 A Little Night Music – Tommy Krasker, producer (Stephen Sondheim, composer; Stephen Sondheim, lyricist)
 Promises, Promises – David Caddick & David Lai, producers (Burt Bacharach, composer; Hal David, lyricist)
 Sondheim on Sondheim – Philip Chaffin & Tommy Krasker, producers (Stephen Sondheim, composer; Stephen Sondheim, lyricist)

 Film, TV and other visual media 
Best Compilation Soundtrack Album for Motion Picture, Television or Other Visual MediaCrazy Heart
Glee: The Music, Volume 1
Tremé
True Blood – Volume 2
The Twilight Saga: Eclipse

Best Score Soundtrack Album for Motion Picture, Television or Other Visual Media
Toy Story 3 – Randy NewmanAlice in Wonderland – Danny Elfman
Avatar – James Horner
Inception – Hans Zimmer
Sherlock Holmes – Hans Zimmer

Best Song Written for Motion Picture, Television or Other Visual Media"The Weary Kind" (From Crazy Heart)Ryan Bingham & T Bone Burnett, songwriters (Ryan Bingham)"Down in New Orleans" (From The Princess and the Frog)
Randy Newman, songwriter (Dr. John)
"I See You" (From Avatar)
Simon Franglen, Kuk Harrell & James Horner, songwriters (Leona Lewis)
"Kiss Like Your Kiss" (From True Blood)
Lucinda Williams, songwriter (Lucinda Williams & Elvis Costello)
"This City" (From Tremé)
Steve Earle, songwriter (Steve Earle)

 Composing and arranging 
Best Instrumental Composition"The Path Among the Trees" – Billy Childs"Aurora" – Patrick Williams
"Battle Circle" – Gerald Clayton
"Box of Cannoli" – Tim Hagans
"Fourth Stream...La Banda" – Bill Cunliffe

Best Instrumental Arrangement"Carlos" – Vince Mendoza"Fanfare for a New Day" – Patrick Williams
"Itsbynne Reel" – Gil Goldstein
"Monet" – Ted Nash
"Skip to My Lou" – Frank Macchia

Best Instrumental Arrangement Accompanying Vocalist(s)"Baba Yetu" Christopher Tin, arranger (Christopher Tin, Soweto Gospel Choir & Royal Philharmonic Orchestra)"Baby" 
Roger Treece, arranger (Bobby McFerrin)
"Based on a Thousand True Stories" 
Vince Mendoza, arranger (Silje Nergaard & Metropole Orchestra Strings)
"Don't Explain" 
Geoffrey Keezer, arranger (Denise Donatelli)
"Imagine" 
Herbie Hancock & Larry Klein, arrangers (Herbie Hancock, Pink, Seal, Jeff Beck, India.Arie, Konono No 1 & Oumou Sangare)

Package
Best Recording PackageBrothers – Michael Carney, art director (The Black Keys)Eggs – Malene Mathiasson, Malthe Fischer, Kristoffer Rom, Nis Svoldgård & Aske Zidore, art directors (Oh No Ono)
Hadestown – Brian Grunert, art director (Anaïs Mitchell)
What Will We Be – Devendra Banhart & Jon Beasley, art directors (Devendra Banhart)
Yonkers NY – Andrew Taray, art director (Chip Taylor)

Best Boxed or Special Limited Edition PackageUnder Great White Northern Lights (Limited Edition Box Set) – Rob Jones & Jack White III, art directors (The White Stripes)Light: On the South Side – Tom Lunt, Rob Sevier & Ken Shipley, art directors (Various Artists)
Minotaur (Deluxe Edition) – Jeff Anderson & Vaughan Oliver, art directors (The Pixies)
A Sideman's Journey (Limited Collector's Super Deluxe Box Set) – Daniel Reiss & Klaus Voormann, art directors (Voormann & Friends)
Story Island – Qing-Yang Xiao, art director (Various Artists)

 Album notes 
Best Album NotesKeep an Eye on the Sky – Robert Gordon, album notes writer (Big Star)Alan Lomax in Haiti: Recordings for the Library of Congress, 1936–1937 – Gage Averill, album notes writer (Various Artists)
Side Steps – Ashley Kahn, album notes writer (John Coltrane)
There Breathes a Hope: The Legacy of John Work III and His Fisk Jubilee Quartet, 1909–1916 – Doug Seroff, album notes writer (Fisk University Jubilee Quartet)
True Love Cast Out All Evil – Will Sheff, album notes writer (Roky Erickson With Okkervil River)

 Historical 
Best Historical AlbumThe Beatles (The Original Studio Recordings)
Jeff Jones, compilation producer; Paul Hicks, Sean Magee, Guy Massey, Sam Okell & Steve Rooke, mastering engineers (The Beatles)
Alan Lomax In Haiti: Recordings For The Library Of Congress, 1936–1937
Jeffrey A. Greenberg, David Katznelson & Anna Lomax Wood, compilation producers; Steve Rosenthal & Warren Russell-Smith, mastering engineers (Various Artists)
The Complete Mother's Best Recordings...Plus!
Colin Escott, Mike Jason & Jett Williams, compilation producers; Joseph M. Palmaccio, mastering engineer (Hank Williams)
Not Fade Away: The Complete Studio Recordings And More
Andy McKaie, compilation producer; Erick Labson, mastering engineer (Buddy Holly)
Where the Action Is! Los Angeles Nuggets 1965–1968
Alec Palao, Cheryl Pawelski & Andrew Sandoval, compilation producers; Dan Hersch & Andrew Sandoval, mastering engineers (Various Artists)

Production, non-classical 
Best Engineered Album, Non-Classical

Battle Studies
Michael H. Brauer, Joe Ferla, Chad Franscoviak & Manny Marroquin, engineers (John Mayer)
Dirty Side Down
John Keane, engineer (Widespread Panic)
Emotion & Commotion
Steve Lipson, engineer (Jeff Beck)
God Willin' & The Creek Don't Rise
Ryan Freeland, engineer (Ray LaMontagne And The Pariah Dogs)
Pink Elephant
Seth Presant & Leon F. Sylvers III, engineers (N'dambi)

Producer Of The Year, Non-Classical

Danger Mouse
 Broken Bells – Broken Bells (A) Dark Night of the Soul – Danger Mouse and Sparklehorse (A) "Tighten Up" – The Black Keys (T)Rob Cavallo
 Brand New Eyes – Paramore (A)
 Hang Cool Teddy Bear – Meat Loaf (A)
 Happy Hour – Uncle Kracker (A)
 "Music Again" – Adam Lambert (T)
 "Soaked" – Adam Lambert (T)
 "Sure Fire Winners" – Adam Lambert (T)
 "Time for Miracles" – Adam Lambert (T)
 "When It's Time" – Green Day (T)
Dr. Luke
 "California Gurls" – Katy Perry featuring Snoop Dogg (T)
 "For Your Entertainment" – Adam Lambert (T)
 "Hungover" – Ke$ha (T)
 "Kiss n Tell" – Ke$ha (T)
 "Magic" – B.o.B. featuring Rivers Cuomo (T)
 "Take It Off" – Ke$ha (T)
 "Teenage Dream" – Katy Perry (T)
 "Your Love Is My Drug" – Ke$ha (T)
RedOne
 "Alejandro" – Lady Gaga (S)
 "Bad Romance" – Lady Gaga (S)
 The Fame Monster – Lady Gaga (A)
 "I Like It" – Enrique Iglesias Featuring Pitbull (S)
 "More" – Usher (T)
 "We Are the World 25 for Haiti" – Various Artists (S)
 "Whole Lotta Love" – Mary J. Blige (S)
The Smeezingtons (Bruno Mars, Philip Lawrence, Ari Levine)
 "Billionaire" – Travie McCoy Featuring Bruno Mars (T)
 "Bow Chicka Wow Wow" – Mike Posner (T)
 "Fuck You" – Cee Lo Green (S)
 "Island Queen" – Sean Kingston (T)
 "Just the Way You Are" – Bruno Mars (S)
 "Nothin' on You" – B.o.B Featuring Bruno Mars (T)

Best Remixed Recording, Non-Classical"Revolver (David Guetta's One Love Club Remix)"David Guetta & Afrojack, remixers (Madonna)"Fantasy (Morgan Page Remix)"
Morgan Page, remixer (Nadia Ali)
"Funk Nasty (Wolfgang Gartner Remix Edit)"
Wolfgang Gartner, remixer (Andy Caldwell Featuring Gram'ma Funk)
"Orpheus (Quiet Carnival) (Funk Generation Mix)"
Mike Rizzo, remixer (Sérgio Mendes)
"Sweet Disposition (Axwell & Dirty South Remix)"
Axel Hedfors & Dragan Roganovic, remixers (The Temper Trap)

Production, surround sound
Best Surround Sound AlbumBritten's Orchestra
Keith O. Johnson, surround mix engineer; Keith O. Johnson, surround mastering engineer; David Frost, surround producer (Michael Stern & Kansas City Symphony)
The Incident
Steven Wilson, surround mix engineer; Darcy Proper, surround mastering engineer; Steven Wilson, surround producer (Porcupine Tree)
Parallax Eden
David Miles Huber, surround mix engineer; David Miles Huber, surround mastering engineer; David Miles Huber, surround producer (David Miles Huber)
Songs and Stories (Monster Music Version)
Don Murray, surround mix engineer; Sangwook Nam & Doug Sax, surround mastering engineers; John Burk, Noel Lee & Marcus Miller, surround producers (George Benson)
Trondheimsolistene – In Folk Style
Morten Lindberg, surround mix engineer; Morten Lindberg, surround mastering engineer; Morten Lindberg, surround producer (TrondheimSolistene)

Production, classical
Best Engineered Album, Classical

Daugherty: Metropolis Symphony; Deus Ex Machina
Mark Donahue, John Hill & Dirk Sobotka, engineers (Giancarlo Guerrero & Nashville Symphony Orchestra)
Have You Ever Been...?
Robert Friedrich, engineer (Turtle Island Quartet, Stefon Harris & Mike Marshall)
Mackey, Steven: Dreamhouse
David Frost, Tom Lazarus, Steven Mackey & Dirk Sobotka, engineers (Gil Rose, Rinde Eckert, Catch Electric Guitar Quartet, Synergy Vocals & Boston Modern Orchestra Project)
Porter, Quincy: Complete Viola Works
Leslie Ann Jones, Kory Kruckenberg & David Sabee, engineers (Eliesha Nelson & John McLaughlin Williams)
Vocabularies
Steve Miller, Allen Sides & Roger Treece, engineers (Bobby McFerrin)

Producer Of The Year, Classical
Blanton Alspaugh
 Corigliano: Violin Concerto 'The Red Violin' (Michael Ludwig, JoAnn Falletta & Buffalo Philharmonic Orchestra)
 Daugherty: Metropolis Symphony; Deus Ex Machina (Giancarlo Guerrero & Nashville Symphony)
 Rachmaninov: Symphony No. 2 (Leonard Slatkin & Detroit Symphony Orchestra)
 Tower Of The Eight Winds – Music For Violin & Piano By Judith Shatin (Borup-Ernst Duo)
 Tyberg: Symphony No. 3; Piano Trio (JoAnn Falletta & Buffalo Philharmonic Orchestra)
 Wind Serenades (Gregory Wolynec & Gateway Chamber Ensemble)
David Frost
 Britten's Orchestra (Michael Stern & Kansas City Symphony)
 Chambers, Evan: The Old Burying Ground (Kenneth Kiesler & The University Of Michigan Symphony Orchestra)
 Dorman, Avner: Concertos For Mandolin, Piccolo, Piano And Concerto Grosso (Andrew Cyr, Eliran Avni, Mindy Kaufman, Avi Avital & Metropolis Ensemble)
 The 5 Browns In Hollywood (5 Browns)
 Mackey, Steven: Dreamhouse (Gil Rose, Rinde Eckert, Catch Electric Guitar Quartet, Synergy Vocals & Boston Modern Orchestra Project)
 Meeting Of The Spirits (Matt Haimovitz)
 Two Roads To Exile (ARC Ensemble)
Tim Handley
 Adams: Nixon In China (Marin Alsop, Tracy Dahl, Marc Heller, Thomas Hammons, Maria Kanyova, Robert Orth, Chen-Ye Yan, Opera Colorado Chorus & Colorado Symphony Orchestra)
 Debussy: Le Martyre De Saint Sébastien (Jun Märkl & Orchestre National De Lyon)
 Dohnányi: Variations On A Nursery Song (JoAnn Falletta, Eldar Nebolsin & Buffalo Philharmonic Orchestra)
 Harris: Symphonies Nos. 5 & 6 (Marin Alsop & Bournemouth Symphony Orchestra)
 Hubay: Violin Concertos Nos. 1 And 2 (Chloë Hanslip, Andrew Mogrelia & Bournemouth Symphony Orchestra)
 Messiaen: Poèmes pour Mi (Anne Schwanewilms, Jun Märkl & Orchestre National De Lyon)
 Piazzolla: Sinfonía Buenos Aires (Daniel Binelli, Tianwa Yang, Giancarlo Guerro & Nashville Symphony Orchestra)
 Ries: Works For Flute And Piano (Uwe Grodd & Matteo Napoli)
 Roussel: Symphony No. 1 (Stéphane Denève & Royal Scottish National Orchestra)
 Shchedrin: Concertos For Orchestra Nos. 4 & 5 (Kirill Karabits & Bournemouth Symphony Orchestra)
 Stamitz: Flute Concertos (Robert Aitken, Donatas Katkus & St. Christopher Chamber Orchestra)
 Strauss, R: Josephs-Legende; Rosenkavalier; Die Frau Ohne Schatten (Orchestral Suites) (JoAnn Falletta & Buffalo Philharmonic Orchestra)
Marina A. Ledin, Victor Ledin
 Brubeck: Songs Of Praise (Lynne Morrow, Richard Grant, Quartet San Francisco & The Pacific Mozart Ensemble)
 Cascade Of Roses (Janice Weber)
 Gnattali: Solo & Chamber Works For Guitar (Marc Regnier)
 If I Were A Bird (Michael Lewin)
 Kletzki: Piano Concerto (Joseph Banowetz, Thomas Sanderling & Russian Philharmonic Orchestra)
 Porter, Quincy: Complete Viola Works (Eliesha Nelson & John McLaughlin Williams)
 Rubinstein: Piano Music (1852–1894) (Joseph Banowetz)
 Rubinstein: Piano Music (1871–1890) (Joseph Banowetz)
 20th Century Harp Sonatas (Sarah Schuster Ericsson)
James Mallinson
 Mahler: Symphony No. 2 (Bernard Haitink, Duain Wolfe, Miah Persson, Christianne Stotijn, Chicago Symphony Chorus & Chicago Symphony Orchestra)
 Prokofiev: Romeo And Juliet (Valery Gergiev & London Symphony Orchestra)
 Shchedrin: The Enchanted Wanderer (Valery Gergiev, Evgeny Akimov, Sergei Aleksashkin, Kristina Kapustinskaya, Mariinsky Chorus & Mariinsky Orchestra)
 Strauss, R: Ein Heldenleben; Webern: Im Sommerwind (Bernard Haitink & Chicago Symphony Orchestra)
 Strauss, R: Eine Alpensinfonie (Bernard Haitink & London Symphony Orchestra)
 Tchaikovsky: Rococo Variations; Prokofiev: Sinfonia Concertante (Gautier Capuçon, Valery Gergiev & Orchestra Of The Mariinsky Theatre)
 Wagner: Parsifal (Valery Gergiev, Gary Lehman, Violeta Urmana, René Pape, Evgeny Nikitin, Alexei Tanovitski, Nikolai Putilin, Mariinsky Chorus & Mariinsky Orchestra)

Classical

Best Classical Album
Bruckner: Symphonies Nos. 3 & 4 – Mariss Jansons, conductor; Everett Porter, producer; Everett Porter, mastering engineer (Royal Concertgebouw Orchestra)
Daugherty: Metropolis Symphony; Deus Ex Machina – Giancarlo Guerrero, conductor; Blanton Alspaugh, producer; Mark Donahue, John Hill & Dirk Sobotka, engineers/mixers (Terrence Wilson; Nashville Symphony Orchestra)
Mackey, Steven: Dreamhouse – Gil Rose, conductor; Rinde Eckert; Catch Electric Guitar Quartet;  David Frost, producer; David Frost, Tom Lazarus, Steven Mackey & Dirk Sobotka, engineers/mixers; Silas Brown, mastering engineer (Boston Modern Orchestra Project; Synergy Vocals)
Sacrificium – Giovanni Antonini, conductor; Cecilia Bartoli; Arend Prohmann, producer; Philip Siney, engineer/mixer (Il Giardino Armonico)
Verdi: Requiem – Riccardo Muti, conductor; Duain Wolfe, chorus master; Christopher Alder, producer; David Frost, Tom Lazarus & Christopher Willis, engineers/mixers (Ildar Abdrazakov, Olga Borodina, Barbara Frittoli & Mario Zeffiri; Chicago Symphony Orchestra; Chicago Symphony Chorus)

Best Orchestral Performance
Bruckner: "Symphonies Nos. 3 & 4" – Mariss Jansons, conductor (Royal Concertgebouw Orchestra)
Daugherty: Metropolis Symphony; "Deus Ex Machina" – Giancarlo Guerrero, conductor (Terrence Wilson; Nashville Symphony)
Mackey, Steven: "Dreamhouse" – Gil Rose, conductor; Rinde Eckert (Catch Electric Guitar Quartet; Boston Modern Orchestra Project; Synergy Vocals)
Salieri: "Overtures & Stage Music" – Thomas Fey, conductor (Mannheimer Mozartorchester)
Stravinsky: Pulcinella; Symphony in Three Movements; "Four Études" – Pierre Boulez, conductor (Roxana Constantinescu, Kyle Ketelsen & Nicholas Phan; Chicago Symphony Orchestra)

Best Opera Recording
Berg: "Lulu"
Antonio Pappano, conductor; Agneta Eichenholz, Jennifer Larmore, Klaus Florian Vogt & Michael Volle; David Groves, producer (Orchestra of The Royal Opera House)
Hasse: "Marc' Antonio E Cleopatra"
Matthew Dirst, conductor; Jamie Barton & Ava Pine; Keith Weber, producer (Ars Lyrica Houston)
Saariaho: "L'Amour de Loin"
Kent Nagano, conductor; Daniel Belcher, Ekaterina Lekhina & Marie-Ange Todorovitch; Martin Sauer, producer (Deutsches Symphonie-Orchester Berlin; Rundfunkchor Berlin)
Shchedrin: "The Enchanted Wanderer"
Valery Gergiev, conductor; Evgeny Akimov, Sergei Aleksashkin & Kristina Kapustinskaya; James Mallinson, producer (Orchestra of the Mariinsky Theatre; Chorus of the Mariinsky Theatre)
Sullivan: "Ivanhoe"
David Lloyd-Jones, conductor; Neal Davies, Geraldine McGreevy, James Rutherford, Toby Spence & Janice Watson; Brian Pidgeon, producer (BBC National Orchestra of Wales; Adrian Partington Singers)

Best Choral Performance

Bach: "Cantatas" – Nikolaus Harnoncourt, conductor; Erwin Ortner, chorus master (Bernarda Fink, Gerald Finley, Christian Gerhaher, Werner Güra, Julia Kleiter, Christine Schäfer, Anton Scharinger & Kurt Streit; Concentus Musicus Wien; Arnold Schoenberg Chor)
"Baltic Runes" – Paul Hillier, conductor (Estonian Philharmonic Chamber Choir)
Haydn: "The Creation" – René Jacobs, conductor; Hans-Christoph Rademann, choir director (Julia Kleiter, Maximilian Schmitt & Johannes Weisser; Freiburger Barockorchester; RIAS Kammerchor)
Martin: "Golgotha" – Daniel Reuss, conductor (Judith Gauthier, Marianne Beate Kielland, Adrian Thompson, Mattijs Van De Woerd & Konstantin Wolff; Estonian National Symphony Orchestra; Cappella Amsterdam & Estonian Philharmonic Chamber Choir)
Verdi: "Requiem" – Riccardo Muti, conductor; Duain Wolfe, chorus master (Ildar Abdrazakov, Olga Borodina, Barbara Frittoli & Mario Zeffiri; Chicago Symphony Orchestra; Chicago Symphony Chorus)

Best Instrumental Soloist(s) Performance (with Orchestra)

Daugherty: "Deus Ex Machina" – Giancarlo Guerrero, conductor; Terrence Wilson (Nashville Symphony)
Dorman, Avner: "Mandolin Concerto" – Andrew Cyr, conductor; Avi Avital (Metropolis Ensemble)
Kletzki: "Piano Concerto in D Minor, Op. 22" – Thomas Sanderling, conductor; Joseph Banowetz (Russian Philharmonic Orchestra)
Mozart: "Piano Concertos Nos. 23 & 24" – Mitsuko Uchida (The Cleveland Orchestra)
Porter, Quincy: "Concerto for Viola & Orchestra" – John McLaughlin Williams, conductor; Eliesha Nelson (Northwest Sinfonia)

Best Instrumental Soloist Performance (without Orchestra)
Messiaen: "Liver du Saint-Sacrement" - Paul Jacobs
Chopin: "The Nocturnes" – Nelson Freire
Hamelin: "Études" – Marc-André Hamelin
Paganini: "24 Caprices" – Julia Fischer
"20th Century Harp Sonatas" – Sarah Schuster Ericsson

Best Chamber Music Performance

Beethoven: "Complete Sonatas for Violin & Piano" – Isabelle Faust and Alexander Melnikov
Gnattali: "Solo & Chamber Works for Guitar – Marc Regnier" (Tacy Edwards, Natalia Khoma & Marco Sartor)
Ligeti: "String Quartets Nos. 1 & 2" – Parker Quartet
Porter, Quincy: "Complete Viola Works" – Eliesha Nelson & John McLaughlin Williams (Douglas Rioth; Northwest Sinfonia)
Schoenberg: "String Quartets Nos. 3 & 4" – Fred Sherry String Quartet (Christopher Oldfather & Rolf Schulte)

Best Small Ensemble Performance
"Ceremony and Devotion – Music for the Tudors" – Harry Christophers, conductor; The Sixteen
"Dinastia Borja" – Jordi Savall, conductor; Hespèrion XXI & La Capella Reial De Catalunya (Pascal Bertin, Daniele Carnovich, Lior Elmalich, Montserrat Figueras, Driss El Maloumi, Marc Mauillon, Lluís Vilamajó & Furio Zanasi; Pascal Bertin, Daniele Carnovich, Josep Piera & Francisco Rojas)
"Trondheimsolistene – In Folk Style" – Øyvind Gimse & Geir Inge Lotsberg, conductors (Emilia Amper & Gjermund Larsen; TrondheimSolistene)
"Victoria: Lamentations Of Jeremiah" – Peter Phillips, conductor; The Tallis Scholars
Whitacre, Eric: "Choral Music" – Noel Edison, conductor; Elora Festival Singers (Carol Bauman & Leslie De'Ath)

Best Classical Vocal Performance
"Ombre de Mon Amant – French Baroque Arias" – Anne Sofie von Otter (William Christie; Les Arts Florissants)
"Sacrificium" – Cecilia Bartoli (Giovanni Antonini; Il Giardino Armonico)
Turina: "Canto A Sevilla" – Lucia Duchonová (Celso Antunes; NDR Radiophilharmonie)
Vivaldi: "Opera Arias – Pyrotechnics" – Vivica Genaux (Fabio Biondi; Europa Galante)
Wagner: "Wesendonck-Lieder" – Measha Brueggergosman (Franz Welser-Möst; The Cleveland Orchestra)

Best Classical Contemporary Composition
"Deus Ex Machina" – Michael Daugherty (Giancarlo Guerrero)
"Appassionatamente Plus" – Hans Werner Henze (Stefan Soltesz)
"Graffiti" – Magnus Lindberg (Sakari Oramo)
"Symphony No. 4" – Arvo Pärt (Esa-Pekka Salonen)
"The Enchanted Wanderer" – Rodion Shchedrin (Valery Gergiev)

Best Classical Crossover Album

Meeting of the Spirits – Matt Haimovitz (Amaryllis Jarczyk, Jan Jarczyk, John McLaughlin, Dominic Painchaud, Leanna Rutt & Matt Wilson)
Off the Map – The Silk Road Ensemble
Roots – My Life, My Song – Jessye Norman (Ira Coleman, Steve Johns, Mike Lovatt, Mark Markham & Martin Williams)
Tin, Christopher: Calling All Dawns – Lucas Richman, conductor. Bill Hare & John Kurlander, engineers/mixers. Christopher Tin, producer. (Sussan Deyhim, Lia, Kaori Omura, Dulce Pontes, Jia Ruhan, Aoi Tada & Frederica von Stade; Anonymous 4 & Soweto Gospel Choir; Royal Philharmonic Orchestra)Vocabularies – Bobby McFerrin

Music video
Best Short Form Music Video"Bad Romance" – Lady GagaFrancis Lawrence, video director; Heather Heller, video producer"Ain't No Grave" – (Johnny Cash)
Chris Milk, video director; Jennifer Heath, Aaron Koblin & Rick Rubin, video producers
"Love the Way You Lie" – Eminem & Rihanna
Joseph Kahn, video director; MaryAnn Tanedo, video producer
"Stylo" – Gorillaz, Mos Def & Bobby Womack
Pete Candeland & Jamie Hewlett, video directors; Cara Speller, video producer
"Fuck You" – Cee Lo Green
Matt Stawski, video director; Paul Bock, video producer

Best Long Form Music VideoWhen You're Strange'' – The Doors
Tom Dicillo, video director; John Beug, Jeff Jampol, Peter Jankowski & Dick Wolf, video producersNo Distance Left to Run – Blur
Will Lovelace, Dylan Southern & Giorgio Testi, video directors; Thomas Benski, Laura Collins & Lucas Ochoa, video producersThe Greatest Ears in Town: The Arif Mardin Story – Arif Mardin
Doug Biro & Joe Mardin, video directors; Doug Biro & Joe Mardin, video producersRush: Beyond the Lighted Stage – Rush
Sam Dunn & Scot McFadyen, video directors; Sam Dunn & Scot McFadyen, video producersUnder Great White Northern Lights'' – The White Stripes
Emmett Malloy, video director; Ian Montone & Mike Sarkissian, video producers

Special Merit Awards

MusiCares Person of the Year 
Barbra Streisand

President's Merit Award 
David Geffen

Lifetime Achievement Award 
Julie Andrews
Roy Haynes
Juilliard String Quartet
The Kingston Trio
Dolly Parton
Ramones
George Beverly Shea

Trustees Award 
Al Bell
Wilma Cozart Fine
Bruce Lundvall

Technical Grammy Award 
Roger Linn

Artists with multiple nominations and awards 

The following artists received multiple nominations:
 Ten: Eminem
 Seven: Bruno Mars
 Six: Jay-Z, Lady Antebellum, and Lady Gaga
 Five: Jeff Beck, B.o.B, David Frost, Philip Lawrence, John Legend and The Roots
 Four: Alex da Kid, The Black Keys, Drake, Cee Lo Green, Ari Levine, Katy Perry, Rihanna, Dirk Sobotka and Zac Brown
 Three: Damon Albarn, Arcade Fire, Beyoncé, Chris Brown, David Frost, Alicia Keys, Miranda Lambert, John Mayer, Muse and Neil Young
 Two: Justin Bieber, Michael Bublé, Matt Cameron, Kristin Chenoweth, Fantasia, Glee Cast, Goldfrapp La Roux, Mumford & Sons, Monica, Usher, Janelle Monáe, Pink, Robert Plant, Sade, Hayley Williams, and The White Stripes

The following artists received multiple awards:
 Five: Lady Antebellum
 Three: David Frost, Jay-Z, John Legend, Jeff Beck and Lady Gaga
 Two: The Black Keys, Eminem, Herbie Hancock, Alicia Keys, The Roots, Usher, Christopher Tin and BeBe Winans

In Memoriam 
James Moody, John D. Kendall, Billy Taylor, Herb Ellis, Lena Horne, Margaret Whiting, Charlie Louvin, Hank Cochran, Carl Smith, Bobby Charles, Bobby Hebb, Gladys Horton, Teena Marie, General Johnson, Gregory Isaacs, Sugar Minott, Harvey Fuqua, Garry Shider, Dick Griffey, Gerry Rafferty, George David Weiss, Wally Traugott, Jim Williamson, Bill Porter, Richie Hayward, Ben Keith, Captain Beefheart, Malcolm McLaren, Herman Leonard, Irwin Silber, Jim Marshall, Jerry Bock, Allyn Ferguson, John Barry, Peter Lopez, Caresse Henry, Bill Aucoin, Hal Uplinger, Ron Baird, Ronni Chasen, Mitch Miller, Roberto Cantoral, Olga Guillot, Enrique Morente, Joan Sutherland, Helen Boatwright, Margaret Price, Earl Wild, Raphael Hillyer, Ronnie James Dio, Doug Fieger, Don Kirshner, Esteban "Steve" Jordan, Tony "Ham" Guerrero, Eddie Fisher, Jimmy Dean, Alex Chilton, Walter Hawkins, Albertina Walker and Solomon Burke.

References

External links
NARAS
Award Fields & categories
Award category description guide
CBS GRAMMY Site

 053
2011 in American music
2011 music awards
2011 in Los Angeles
2011 awards in the United States
February 2011 events in the United States